Bruno Rodzik (29 May 1935 – 12 April 1998) was a French former football defender. He played for France in the Euro 1960.

International career
Rodzik was born in France, and was of Polish descent. He was an international footballer for the France national football team.

Titles
French championship in 1958, 1960, 1962 with Stade de Reims
European Cup runner-up in 1959 with Stade de Reims

References

External links
 
 
Profile 

1935 births
1998 deaths
French footballers
France international footballers
French people of Polish descent
Association football defenders
Stade de Reims players
OGC Nice players
1960 European Nations' Cup players
Ligue 1 players
Sportspeople from Meurthe-et-Moselle
Footballers from Grand Est